The Silver Salver is a greyhound racing competition held annually at Central Park Stadium in Sittingbourne, Kent.

It was inaugurated as the Thames Silver Salver in 1933 at Southend Stadium but was discontinued following the closure of the stadium in 1985. However it was resurrected in 1988 by Canterbury. Once again the competition came to an end when Canterbury closed in 1999. In 2002 Sittingbourne brought back the competition in the new guise of the Kent Silver Salver.

After not being held from 2014-2016 the race returned in 2017 and one year later reverted to the format of a sprint competition.

Past winners

Venues & Distances
1933–1952 (Southend, 600y)
1953–1974 (Southend, 300y)
1975–1985 (Southend, 277m)
1988–1999 (Canterbury, 245m)
1993–1994, 2021 (not held)
2002–2013 (Central Park, 265m)
2017–2017 (Central Park, 450m)
2018–present (Central Park, 265m)

Sponsors
2010–2012 (Cab-It)
2013–2015 (Tiger Taxi's)
2020–2020 (Colossus Bets)
2022–present (Arena Racing Company)

References

Greyhound racing competitions in the United Kingdom
Sport in Sittingbourne
Recurring sporting events established in 1933